Angolar Creole is a minority Portuguese-based creole language of São Tomé and Príncipe, spoken in the southernmost towns of São Tomé Island and sparsely along the coast, especially by Angolar people. It is also called n'golá by its native speakers. It is a creole language with a majority Portuguese lexicon and a heavy substrate of a dialect of Kimbundu (port. Quimbundo), a Bantu language from inland Angola, where many had come from prior to being enslaved. It is rather different from Sãotomense, the other creole language spoken on the island.

Description 
It is a Portugues-based creole language different from other Portugues-based creole languages in Africa. The main difference is the substrate form Kimbundu and Kikongo from Angola.

History 
In the middle of the 16th century, a slave ship from Angola sunk before the soutern coast of São Tomé. The surviving people aboard settled the coast as free fishermen. Their language was different from other creole language on the island. Today, between 10% and 20% of its linguistic elements are still of African origin.

References

Further reading

External links 
 APiCS Online - Survey chapter: Angolar

Portuguese-based pidgins and creoles
Languages of São Tomé and Príncipe
Portuguese language in Africa